Criminal order or criminal orders may refer to:
Criminal order (international law), an order to commit a war crime or violate international law
Criminal orders (Nazi Germany), orders to commit war crimes issued by the military of Nazi Germany
Protection order, also known as a criminal order

See also
Superior orders, a defense for war crimes